Colossus is the fourth and final studio album by the American alternative rock band Walt Mink, released in 1997.

Critical reception
The Wisconsin State Journal stated: "The diversity of Colossus shows Walt Mink toning down some of its bombast and cutting loose more than ever: From the odd tunings of the almost-too-precious 'She Can Smile' to the hand-claps of the sparkling acoustic ballad 'Act of Quiet Desperation', Walt Mink seems more assured than ever doing what it does best."

AllMusic wrote: "Energetic and fiery on just about every track with few indications of studio trickery or even a mid-tempo ballad, Colossus just keeps on chugging from start to stop."

Track listing 
All tracks by John Kimbrough
 "Goodnite" - 3:43
 "John's Dream" - 5:05
 "She Can Smile" - 2:56
 "Brave Beyond the Call" - 4:05
 "Lost in the World" - 5:14
 "Lovely Arrhythmia" - 3:33
 "Boots" - 4:08
 "Lama" - 2:59
 "Act of Quiet Desperation" - 3:18
 "Freetime" - 6:26

Personnel 
 John Kimbrough - guitar, vocals, cover photo
 Candice Belanoff - bass guitar, backing vocals
 Orestes Morfin - drums, percussion, backing vocals
 Doug "Mr Colson" Olson - production, engineering, mix, photos
 Andy Olson - assistant engineer
 Roger Lian - mastering

References

External links
 "Releases" page on Walt Mink's official site @ The Internet Archive (includes lyrics)

1997 albums
Walt Mink albums